Hard dough bread, also called hardo bread, is a Caribbean cuisine bread similar to the Pullman loaf or pain de mie, although hard dough bread tends to be sweeter. The dough consists of flour, water, yeast, salt and sugar. Additional ingredients such as treacle, molasses, and vegetable shortening can be used. It typically has a dense consistency and is typically brushed with sugared water before baking. It is a staple food in Jamaican households.

Hard dough bread loaves are usually rectangular and can be bought already sliced or unsliced. Most loaves are wrapped in plastic when bought.

History
The bread originated from Chinese immigrants who brought the recipe to Jamaica.

Usage
Hard dough bread is used much the same as a Pullman loaf: as a vehicle for spreads such as butter, cheese or jam; for dipping into liquids, a common one being hot chocolate; or to make sandwiches. It is also commonly paired with various kinds of porridge (such as cornmeal, green banana, peanut etc.) in the Jamaican household, and is eaten by breaking a slice into small chunks and mixing them into the cooked porridge after serving. Hard dough bread is more resistant than Pullman bread to becoming soggy and breaking apart in sandwiches with fried, greasy fillings such as plantain and egg.

See also

 Bulla bread
 Bammy
 Coco bread
 Jamaican cuisine
 List of breads
 List of Jamaican dishes

References

Yeast breads
Jamaican cuisine
Jamaican breads